Severynivka may refer to:
 Severinovca, Camenca District, Moldova (Ukrainian spelling)
 Severynivka, Vinnytsia Oblast, Ukraine